Nordic Freedom is a right-wing party group on the Nordic Council.

Members
The member organizations of the Nordic Freedom are:

Only the Sweden Democrats are a member of a European party (Alliance of Conservatives and Reformists in Europe). In the European Parliament, the MEPs of the True Finns and the Danish People's Party are part of the Identity and Democracy parliamentary group, whilst the MEPs of the Sweden Democrats are member of the European Conservatives and Reformists group.

Elected representatives of Member Parties

European institutions

References

Pan-European political parties
Scandinavian political parties
Party groups in the Nordic Council